Bylo nás pět is a Czech comedy television series. It is based on a book by Karel Poláček. Karel Smyczek directed the series.

It was broadcast by Czech Television in January 1995. The series has six episodes and enjoys constant repetition on television screens and the interest of viewers.

Plot
The series takes place in 1930s. The plot follows a small boy Petr Bajza, who together with his friends Čeňek Jirsák, Antonín Bejval, Eda Kemlink and Pepek Zilvar experience various adventures. The plot also follows the fate of Peter's family and the budding relationship between Kristýna and the young womanizer Pivoda.

Cast and characters
 Adam Novák as Petr Bajza
 Jaroslav Pauer as Čeněk Jirsák
 Štěpán Benyovszký as Antonín Bejval
 Jan Brynych as Eda Kemlink
 Jan Müller as Pepek Zilvar
 Oldřich Navrátil as Mr. Bajza
 Dagmar Veškrnová as Mrs. Bajzová
 Barbora Srncová as Kristýna „Rampepurda“
 Jiří Langmajer as Pivoda

Production
Ondřej Vogeltanz, Karel Smyczek and Helena Slavíková participated in the adaptation of the novel by Karel Poláček. The series is supplemented with motifs from other Poláček books, such as the book District Town. In the novel characters of the Bajza family are also depicted much less. Vogeltanz and Smyczek wanted to develop a relationships between them.

Filming took place during 130 days in the town of Kouřim and in Barrandov Studios interiors.

References

External links
 
 Bylo nás pět on Czech Television

1995 television series debuts
1995 television series endings
Czech comedy television series
Czech-language television shows
Television shows set in the Czech Republic
Television shows filmed in the Czech Republic
Czech Television original programming